Splendrillia globosa is a species of sea snail, a marine gastropod mollusk in the family Drilliidae.

Description
The shell is dirty white to dark brownish, often without indistinct brown colour bands. The shell has 9-10 whorls. The aperture is moderately large. The apertural margin is white and slightly reflective. The umbilicus is wide and mostly covered by the reflective columellar margin.

The width of the shell is 30–90 mm. The height of the shell is 30–55 mm.

Distribution
This marine species occurs off New Caledonia.

References

 Wells, Fred E. "A revision of the drilliid genera Splendrillia and Plagiostropha (Gastropoda: Conoidea) from New Caledonia, with additional records from other areas." Mémoires du Muséum national d'histoire naturelle 167 (1995): 527–556.

External links
  Tucker, J.K. 2004 Catalog of recent and fossil turrids (Mollusca: Gastropoda). Zootaxa 682:1-1295.
 Holotype at MNHN, Paris

globosa
Gastropods described in 1995